A cricket or saddle is a ridge structure designed to divert water on a roof around the high side of a large penetration, typically a Skylight, Equipment Curb, or chimney. In some cases, a cricket can be used to transition from one roof area to another. On low-slope and flat roofs with parapet walls, crickets are commonly used to divert water to the drainage, against or perpendicular to the main roof slope.

The pitch of a cricket is sometimes the same as the rest of the roof, but not always. For Steep-slope roofs, it is most common to have the cricket pitch to be equal to or less than the main roof, however for low-slope or flat roofs, it is more common to see the cricket be at least 50% greater slope than the roof, to minimize ponding. Smaller crickets (on steep-slope roofs only) are covered with metal flashing, and larger ones can be covered with the same material as the rest of the roof.

References

Roofs